

Events

Unknown date events
 Richard Trevithick moves to Peru with the intention of designing and building steam locomotives for mining operations there.

Births

January births 
 January 3 – Samuel C. Pomeroy, president of the Atchison, Topeka and Santa Fe Railway 1863–1868 (d. 1891).

March births
 March 1 – John Souther, American steam locomotive manufacturer, founder of Globe Locomotive Works (d. 1911).

August births
 August 4 – Russell Sage, American financier, director of Union Pacific Railroad (d. 1906).
 August 6 – Thomas Russell Crampton, English engineer and designer of the Crampton locomotive type as well as a tunnel boring machine for the Channel Tunnel (d. 1888).
 August 24 – Daniel Gooch, Chief mechanical engineer of the Great Western Railway (England) (d. 1889).

October births
 October 8 – Aretas Blood, American steam locomotive manufacturer, owner of Manchester Locomotive Works (d. 1897).

Deaths

References
 Newcomb, Kenneth W., The Makers of the Mold. Retrieved February 15, 2005.
 (September 24, 2004), Sir Daniel Gooch. Retrieved February 9, 2005.
 (September 25, 2004), Thomas Crampton. Retrieved February 9, 2005.